Abendroth & Root Manufacturing Company were a manufacturer of water heaters, water tanks, and other sanitation equipment. 

The company was founded in Newburgh, New York, in 1866. It was known for manufacturing the Root Water Tube Boiler and was noted for supplying the Philadelphia Edison Electric Light Company with 3,500 horsepower of boilers. It entered the automobile business in 1906. Using the name Frontenac, they catered to the upper middle class, featuring large-displacement four-cylinder engines. Only twelve were built the first year

Production peaked at 100 vehicles per year in 1907 and dropped off from there until production ended in 1913. Variations of manufactured vehicles included the roundabout, the touring car, limousine and the truck called Model F. As a result of the decline in production, the company abandoned the effort and returned to their original business. The factory was located at the foot of Park Place.

The company was unrelated to the Frontenac Motor Corporation, founded by Louis Chevrolet and his brothers.

See also
List of automobile manufacturers
List of defunct automobile manufacturers

References

Brass Era vehicles
Vintage vehicles
Manufacturing companies established in 1866
Defunct manufacturing companies based in New York (state)
1900s cars
1910s cars
Vehicle manufacturing companies disestablished in 1913
Defunct motor vehicle manufacturers of the United States
1866 establishments in New York (state)
Vehicle manufacturing companies established in 1906